XUI may refer to:

 X User Interface, a VMS Graphical user interface by DEC
 XOS (operating system), formerly XUI
 Xui (crater), on Mars
 XUI, Standard Carrier Alpha Code for Xpress United Inc.

See also
Xiu, a Chinese e-commerce company
Xiu Xiu (disambiguation)